Rock River Renegades is a 1942 American Western film directed by S. Roy Luby. The film is the thirteenth in Monogram Pictures' "Range Busters" series, and it stars Ray "Crash" Corrigan as Crash, John "Dusty" King as Dusty and Max "Alibi" Terhune as Alibi, with Christine McIntyre, John Elliott and Weldon Heyburn.

Cast 
Ray Corrigan as Crash Corrigan
John 'Dusty' King as Dusty King
Max Terhune as Alibi Terhune
Elmer as Elmer, Alibi's Dummy
Christine McIntyre as Grace Ross
John Elliott as Dick Ross (editor, Rock River Advocate)
Weldon Heyburn as Jim Dawson aka Phil Sanford
Kermit Maynard as Marshal Luke Graham
Frank Ellis as Chuck (stage robber)
Carl Mathews as Joe (stage robber)
Richard Cramer as Ed (bartender)
Tex Palmer as Henchman Tex

See also
The Range Busters series:

 The Range Busters (1940)
 Trailing Double Trouble (1940)
 West of Pinto Basin (1940)
 Trail of the Silver Spurs (1941)
 The Kid's Last Ride (1941)
 Tumbledown Ranch in Arizona (1941)
 Wrangler's Roost (1941)
 Fugitive Valley (1941)
 Saddle Mountain Roundup (1941)
 Tonto Basin Outlaws (1941)
 Underground Rustlers (1941)
 Thunder River Feud (1942)
 Rock River Renegades (1942)
 Boot Hill Bandits (1942)
 Texas Trouble Shooters (1942)
 Arizona Stage Coach (1942)
 Texas to Bataan (1942)
 Trail Riders (1942)
 Two Fisted Justice (1943)
 Haunted Ranch (1943)
 Land of Hunted Men (1943)
 Cowboy Commandos (1943)
 Black Market Rustlers (1943)
 Bullets and Saddles (1943)

External links 

1942 films
1940s English-language films
American black-and-white films
1942 Western (genre) films
Monogram Pictures films
American Western (genre) films
Films directed by S. Roy Luby
Range Busters
1940s American films